Abd-El-Aziz Safimayo Yousef (born 5 October 1999) is a professional footballer who plays as a winger for Rivers FC in League1 British Columbia. Born in Saudi Arabia, he represents Somalia internationally.

Early life
Yousef was born in Saudi Arabia, and was raised in Vancouver to parents of Somali origin. Prior to signing with Wanderers, Yousef was a trialist for the youth programme of Dutch Eerste Divisie side Cambuur.

Club career
On 9 April 2019, Yousef signed with Canadian Premier League side HFX Wanderers. After not playing a single match throughout the 2019 season, On December 14, the club announced that Yousef would not be returning for 2020.

In May 2022, he signed with Rivers FC in League1 British Columbia.

International career
Yousef was called up to the Somalia national team for a pair of 2022 FIFA World Cup qualifying matches against Zimbabwe on August 25, 2019. He made his debut for the Ocean Stars in the first match in Djibouti on September 5 which ended in a 1–0 victory. This result also was the first ever win in World Cup qualifying for Somalia in the nation's history. In December 2019 Yousef was called up for the 2019 CECAFA Cup, where he started four matches as Somalia was eliminated in the group stage.

References

External links
HFX Wanderers player profile

1999 births
Living people
Association football wingers
Canadian soccer players
People with acquired Somali citizenship
Somalian footballers
Soccer players from Vancouver
Somalian emigrants to Canada
Naturalized citizens of Canada
Canadian expatriate soccer players
Somalian expatriate footballers
Expatriate footballers in the Netherlands
Canadian expatriate sportspeople in the Netherlands
HFX Wanderers FC players
Canadian Premier League players
Somalia international footballers
League1 British Columbia players
Rivers FC players